Alcibiade may refer to:

Alcibiade, winner of 1865 Grand National horse race
Alcibiade, alternate title of the 1693 opera La libertà contenta by Agostino Steffani
Raffaele Alcibiade (born 1990), an Italian footballer

See also
Alcibiades (disambiguation)